Polygala chapmanii is a flowering plant species in the milkwort family (Polygalaceae). It is endemic to states in the southeastern United States bordering the Gulf of Mexico including Alabama and parts of the Florida panhandle but is not reported from Texas. It is an annual and grows to about two feet tall. It is a dicot.

References

chapmanii